Hyalospectra altipustularia is a moth in the family Drepanidae. It was described by Jeremy Daniel Holloway in 1998. It is found on Borneo.

References

Moths described in 1998
Drepaninae